Mykola Olehovych "Nikolay" Zherdev (born November 5, 1984) is a Ukrainian-Russian professional ice hockey right winger who is currently playing for the HC Merano of the Alps Hockey League.

He previously played in the National Hockey League (NHL) for the Columbus Blue Jackets, New York Rangers and Philadelphia Flyers.

Playing career

Early career
Born in Kiev, Ukraine, Zherdev began playing hockey at the age of four. He began his training with the Sokil Kyiv junior hockey affiliate. Due to complications with organizing a team for his age group, he was pushed to play a year ahead with the 1983 born players; a group which included fellow future Ukrainian NHLer Anton Babchuk. Zherdev played in the 1998 Quebec International Pee-Wee Hockey Tournament with his youth team from Kyiv. While playing in the tournament, Zherdev's team found itself competing against a team from Elektrostal, Russia. The rival team's coach, Ravil Iskhakov, took note of both Zherdev and Babchuk, and invited the pair to further their development with the Elemash Elektrostal hockey club of the Russian Major League, to which they accepted together. The desire to play at a higher level came at a price: his nationality. In order to play in Russia, he would be forced to apply for Russian citizenship.

CSKA Moscow
As his game progressed and professional teams began to take notice, Elektrostal received offers from the likes of Lokomotiv Yaroslavl, Ak Bars Kazan, and CSKA Moscow for Zherdev's services. He would accept an invitation for Elektrostal to loan him to the latter team, CSKA, citing a desire to train under esteemed coach Viktor Tikhonov.

Following being drafted by the Columbus Blue Jackets, Zherdev spent the entire 2002–03 season with CSKA, but in a controversial decision, he left for the NHL halfway through the 2003–04 season. He would, however, return to the Russian club during the 2004–05 NHL lockout, making peace.

Columbus Blue Jackets
Zherdev was drafted by Columbus in the 2003 NHL Entry Draft with the fourth overall pick. At the time, Columbus general manager Doug MacLean stated that the team had Zherdev ranked number one on their draft list.
The 2005–06 NHL season was a breakout year for Zherdev, who scored 27 goals and notched 27 assists in 73 games. He was the Blue Jackets' most potent offensive threat while Rick Nash recuperated from injury, and played most of the season on the team's first line.

The 2006–07 NHL season was a low point for Zherdev, as he struggled to score consistently and frequently clashed with the Jackets' coaching staff, leading to repeated rumors that he might be traded before the 2007–08 NHL season began. In response, Blue Jackets General Manager Scott Howson and then-coach Ken Hitchcock met Zherdev in a "clean-the-slate" meeting. Following the meeting, Zherdev rediscovered success on the ice.

Contract dispute
Contract negotiations with Blue Jackets management following the 2005–06 season became acrimonious. Zherdev threatened to remain in Russia for the season unless his demands were met, while Columbus insisted that Zherdev's salary demands were not commensurate with his accomplishments. On September 28, 2006, the parties finally agreed to a $7.5 million, three-year contract.

New York Rangers

On July 2, 2008, Zherdev was traded by the Blue Jackets along with Dan Fritsche to the New York Rangers for defencemen Fedor Tyutin and Christian Bäckman. In his first season with the Rangers, Zherdev tied for the team lead in points with Scott Gomez, scoring 58 points.

As a restricted free agent, Zherdev was tendered a qualifying offer of $3.25 million by the Rangers before the start of the 2009 free agency period so the team could retain his rights as the two sides negotiate. Zherdev was awarded $3.9 million (USD) in arbitration, however, the New York Rangers chose to let Zherdev go.

KHL
The aforementioned walkaway made Zherdev an unrestricted free agent. Zherdev signed on September 15, 2009, a one-year contract for Atlant Moscow Oblast.

NHL return
On July 9, 2010, Zherdev signed a one-year deal for $2 million with the Philadelphia Flyers, setting up his return to the NHL. This NHL stint would last 56 games through one season as Zherdev did not garner the trust of Flyers head coach Peter Laviolette due to what the coach saw as lackadaisical effort and selfish play. For the majority of the season, Zherdev received limited ice time while playing the fourth line with very offensively limited linemates and rarely saw any power play time. Despite the lack of opportunities, Zherdev would manage a productive 16 goals, which included his 100th NHL goal. After the season the Flyers did not attempt to sign him to a contract extension.

Back to KHL
Following the 2010–11 season, Zherdev returned to Atlant Moscow Oblast. In the 2012–13, he was announced as the team Captain. He played in 39 games registering an impressive 37 points before he was traded to Ak Bars Kazan on January 15, 2013, to complete the season.

After signing a one-year deal with HC Lev Praha in July 2013, Zherdev celebrated at the Barvikha Luxury Village hotel in Moscow where things turned violent, according to a Russian news report. Zherdev allegedly initiated a bar brawl at the hotel before crashing his Bentley Continental GT, which was later vandalized by locals who were outraged with his behaviour and scratched the words "scum", "bastard", and others into the vehicle's paint with nails. Damage to the vehicle was allegedly valued at $30,000. Barvikha Luxury Village hotel staff also claimed Zherdev spent nights there with various women, prompting his wife, Eugenia, to file for divorce. Zherdev also lost his passport as a result of the incident, meaning that he could not fly to his new team's training camp in Finland.

He was released from his contract with Lev and on September 24, 2013, he was signed to a one-year contract with HC Spartak Moscow. After failing to score a goal in 16 games with the club, he was released by the team in mid-November before accepting a short-term deal with HC Severstal.

On July 14, 2014, Zherdev continued his journeyman career, in agreeing to a one-year contract with HC Dynamo Moscow for the 2014–15 season.

International play
Nikolai Zherdev represented Russia at the 2002 U-18 World Junior Championships, helping that country to a silver medal. He finished the tournament with 6 goals, 5 assists, 11 points in 8 games (third best on his team, behind only Alexander Ovechkin and Alexander Semin).

Zherdev also played at the 2003 U-20 World Junior Championships, registering only one assist in six games, playing a minor role in Russia's quest for the gold medal.

He was named captain of Team Russia for the 2004 World Juniors, but did not play after departing for the NHL.

Personal
Zherdev is fluent in Ukrainian and Russian, and can speak limited English.

Career statistics

Regular season and playoffs

International

Awards and achievements
2003–04: Played in the NHL YoungStars Game

References

External links

 
RussianProspects.com Nikolai Zherdev Player Profile

1984 births
Living people
Ak Bars Kazan players
Atlant Moscow Oblast players
Bratislava Capitals players
Columbus Blue Jackets draft picks
Columbus Blue Jackets players
HC CSKA Moscow players
HC Dynamo Moscow players
Kristall Elektrostal players
National Hockey League first-round draft picks
HC Neftekhimik Nizhnekamsk players
New York Rangers players
Philadelphia Flyers players
Russian ice hockey right wingers
Severstal Cherepovets players
HC Sochi players
HC Spartak Moscow players
Sportspeople from Kyiv
Syracuse Crunch players
Torpedo Nizhny Novgorod players
HC Merano players
Ukrainian ice hockey right wingers
Naturalised citizens of Russia
Russian expatriate ice hockey people
Russian expatriate sportspeople in the United States
Russian expatriate sportspeople in Latvia
Russian expatriate sportspeople in Italy
Russian expatriate sportspeople in Slovakia
Ukrainian expatriate ice hockey people
Ukrainian expatriate sportspeople in the United States
Ukrainian expatriate sportspeople in Latvia
Ukrainian expatriate sportspeople in Italy
Ukrainian expatriate sportspeople in Slovakia
Expatriate ice hockey players in the United States
Expatriate ice hockey players in Latvia
Expatriate ice hockey players in Italy
Expatriate ice hockey players in Slovakia